Casa Magazines is a newsstand in Manhattan, New York City.

History 
Casa Magazines is a corner shop, located at 8th Avenue and 12th Street in West Village, Manhattan. It is known for selling international fashion and design publications in print format. In 1994, the shop was purchased by Mohammed Ahmed, who has been dubbed as "the last king of print" by The New York Times. He is assisted by Ali Wasim, who has been working with Casa since 1995.

In media 

 The New York Times' insider report — "Casa Magazines Is New York City's Best Kept Secret. The Secret Is Out".
 BBC News's special coverage — "Surviving Covid: How this New York newsstand kept going".

Gallery

References 

West Village
Shops in New York City